Edward Harbert "Doc" Marshall (June 4, 1906 – September 1, 1999) was an infielder in Major League Baseball. He played for the New York Giants from 1929 to 1932.

References

External links

1906 births
1999 deaths
People from New Albany, Mississippi
Major League Baseball infielders
New York Giants (NL) players
Baseball players from Mississippi
Ole Miss Rebels baseball players